Pholiota was built as the home of architects Walter Burley Griffin and Marion Mahony Griffin in 1920 at 23 Glenard Drive in Eaglemont, Victoria, Australia. The house is listed on the Victorian Heritage Register.

The Griffins used Knitlock construction to build this, their first home, on land they owned on the Glenard Estate next door to that of his sister Genevieve and brother-in- law Roy Alstan Lippincott at 21 Glenard Drive, the Lippincott House, a house also listed on the Victorian Heritage Register.

Walter Burley Griffin with the builder David Charles Jenkins patented the Knitlock concrete units in 1917. The Knitlock system was designed as an economical, flexible and quick do-it-yourself construction system, with machine produced standard concrete tiles, or segments, which were fitted together on site. Few Knitlock buildings were constructed and Pholiota is one of a small number that survive.

The house was a small, single storey house with square plan, containing a central room with a pyramidal ceiling, surrounded by alcoves. These alcoves contained the entrance and service areas and two bedroom alcoves. The floor was brick laid directly on the ground.

Alterations and extensions in 1938, 1975 and the 1990s by subsequent owners have obscured the view of the original building from the street.

In October 2016,  for the exhibition “Pholiota Unlocked”, students at the Melbourne School of Design, University of Melbourne  built a full scale plaster replica of the house.

The house was named Pholiota after a genus of mushroom.

References 

Houses in Victoria (Australia)
Marion Mahony Griffin
Buildings and structures in the City of Banyule
Houses completed in 1920
1920 establishments in Australia
Heritage-listed buildings in Melbourne